Duett for trombone and double bass is a musical work by the English composer Edward Elgar.

The duet was composed as wedding gift to Frank Weaver, a brother of Helen Weaver to whom the composer had been engaged some four years earlier, and presented to him on 1 August 1887 when he married Fannie Jones. Weaver was about a year older than Elgar; he was a shoemaker and an amateur double bass player, and Elgar played the trombone. Frank and Helen Weaver were among the children of William Weaver, a shoe merchant whose shop was in Worcester High Street, opposite Elgar's father's music shop.

The manuscript was inherited by one of Frank Weaver's sons, and was eventually published by Rodney Slatford (Yorke Edition) in 1970.

Description
The duet is an Allegretto of length 49 bars. It is in the form of a fugue in which the subject is first played by the double bass then imitated by the trombone a fourth higher.

Notes

References

External links
 

Chamber music by Edward Elgar
1887 compositions
Instrumental duets
Music dedicated to family or friends